This is the list of awards and nominations received by Descendants of the Sun, a 2016 South Korean television series.

Awards and nominations

References

Descendants of the Sun